Filippo Baldi (born 10 January 1996) is an Italian tennis player who was a semifinalist at the 2013 Australian Open – Boys' singles and quarterfinalist at the 2014 Wimbledon Championships – Boys' singles. With Gianluigi Quinzi he won the 2012 Junior Davis Cup defeating the Australian team: it was the first time ever for an Italian team.

Baldi's first success came as a doubles player, winning 9 Futures titles between 2014 and 2017. His first two singles titles on the Futures tour came in 2017 (both in Hammamet, Tunisia).

In 2018, Baldi made his first ATP main draw appearance as a qualifier at the Rome Masters, losing to Nikoloz Basilashvili. Paired with Andrea Pellegrino, he won the double title in the 2018 Internazionali di Tennis Città dell'Aquila. His first singles title on the ATP Challenger Tour was at the 2018 Wolffkran Open.

Challenger and Futures finals

Singles: 6 (3–3)

Doubles: 24 (11–13)

References

External links
 
 

Italian male tennis players
1996 births
Living people
21st-century Italian people